Norman Towns (born December 26, 1985) is an actor, comedian, and producer. He is best known for his roles as Bennett on HBO's Insecure and on the TV series The Affair.

Early life and education
Norman Towns was born December 26, 1985, in Los Angeles, California. Towns began writing skits at the age of 14. Towns was a stand-up comedian for 4 years prior to acting.

Towns played basketball at University of Providence and graduated magna cum laude.

Career
In 2014 Towns landed his debut acting role portraying Muhammad Ali in the feature film - I Am Ali.

Towns starred in the BET original series Games People Play, which aired in 2019. In the same year, Towns appeared in two episodes the HBO comedy series Insecure as a guest performer before returning for a recurring role in season four.

In 2020 Towns became the executive producer of the film "The Dunbar Heist," inspired by the Dunbar Armored robbery of 1997.

Filmography

Film

Television

References

External links 
 

Living people
American actors
HBO people
American comedians
American producers
African-American actors
21st-century American actors
Male actors from Los Angeles
1985 births
21st-century African-American people
20th-century African-American people